Jazz Nocture is an album by saxophonist Lee Konitz's Quartet, recorded in 1992 for the Japanese Venus label and released in the US on the Evidence label.

Critical reception 

The AllMusic review stated: "Konitz digs into seven standards with an impressive rhythm section (pianist Kenny Barron, bassist James Genus and drummer Kenny Washington) and constantly comes up with interesting ideas and new twists. There are no phony disguises of familiar tunes with new titles on this date; just creative blowing. ... This CD is recommended as a strong example of Lee Konitz's playing in the '90s".

Track listing 
 "You'd Be So Nice to Come Home To" (Cole Porter) – 6:14
 "Everything Happens to Me" (Matt Dennis, Tom Adair) – 7:18
 "Alone Together"(Arthur Schwartz, Howard Dietz) – 9:15
 "Misty" (Erroll Garner) – 5:50
 "Body and Soul" (Johnny Green, Frank Eyton, Edward Heyman, Robert Sour) – 8:52
 "My Funny Valentine" (Richard Rodgers, Lorenz Hart) – 7:04
 "In a Sentimental Mood" (Duke Ellington) – 6:21

Personnel 
Lee Konitz – alto saxophone, soprano saxophone
Kenny Barron – piano
James Genus – bass (tracks 1 & 3-7)
Kenny Washington – drums (tracks 1 & 3-7)

References 

Lee Konitz albums
1994 albums
Venus Records albums